The Valea lui Iovan is a river in Romania, right tributary of the Cerna. Its source is in the Godeanu Mountains. It discharges into the Valea lui Iovan Reservoir.

References

Rivers of Romania
Rivers of Gorj County